Kapasan railway station is a railway station in Chittorgarh district, Rajasthan. Its code is KIN. It serves Kapasan city. The station consists of a single platform. Passenger, Express and Superfast trains halt here.

Trains

The following trains halt at Kapasan in both directions:

 Udaipur City–New Jalpaiguri Weekly Express
 Ratlam–Udaipur City Express
 Veer Bhumi Chittaurgarh Express
 Udaipur City–Jaipur Intercity Express
 Udaipur City–Haridwar Express
 Mewar Express
 Chetak Express

References

Railway stations in Chittorgarh district
Ajmer railway division